Clarence Strait, originally Duke of Clarence Strait, is a strait in southeastern Alaska, in the United States in the Alexander Archipelago. The strait separates Prince of Wales Island, on the west side,  from Revillagigedo Island and Annette Island, on the east side. Moira Sound is on the west side of the strait.

Clarence Strait was named in 1793 by George Vancouver in honor of Prince William, Duke of Clarence. Jacinto Caamaño, who had explored the region a year before Vancouver, named the strait Entrada de Nuestra Senora del Carmen.

The Guard Island Light and Lincoln Rocks Light, both located adjacent to Clarence Strait, were important aids-to-navigation in the Clarence Strait area in the pre-automated era.

Swimming
The first person to swim across Clarence Strait was Michelle Macy, who accomplished the feat in 6 hours 46 minutes on 5 July 2010.

See also
Alaska boundary dispute
Grindall Island

References

External links
 Clarence Strait, The Columbia Gazetteer of North America

Straits of Alaska
Straits of the Pacific Ocean
Bodies of water of Ketchikan Gateway Borough, Alaska
Straits of Prince of Wales–Hyder Census Area, Alaska
Straits of Wrangell, Alaska